The HBO television drama The Sopranos received considerable critical attention for effective use of an eclectic array of music. Series creator David Chase personally selected all the show's music, with the producer Martin Bruestle and music editor Kathryn Dayak—sometimes also consulting Steven Van Zandt, who portrays Silvio Dante on the show and is also a guitarist for Bruce Springsteen's E Street Band. They often selected music after completing an episode's production and editing, but occasionally filmed sequences to match pre-selected pieces of music.

Stylistically, the music on the show ranges from mainstream pop (Britney Spears, The Bangles) to oldies and classic rock artists (The Beach Boys, The Rolling Stones, Pink Floyd), from classic jazz and soul (Ella Fitzgerald, Ben E. King) to hip-hop (Xzibit, Time Zone), often within a single episode.

Opening credits
In the opening credits for each episode, Tony Soprano (James Gandolfini) drives from the Lincoln Tunnel to his home in North Caldwell, New Jersey. The musical accompaniment for this segment is the "Chosen One Remix" of the song "Woke Up This Morning" by the British group Alabama 3 (known in the United States as A3 for legal reasons). "Woke Up This Morning (Chosen One Mix)" is four minutes and five seconds long, so a shortened version of it is used in the opening credits, which is approximately one minute and thirty seconds long.

End credits
Each episode's closing credits sequence features a unique piece of previously recorded music, with few exceptions. The episode "A Hit Is a Hit" uses a song by the fictional band Defiler, which appeared earlier in the episode. Three episodes feature multiple songs in the credits sequence ("Commendatori," "Whitecaps" and "Cold Stones"), while two episodes ("Full Leather Jacket" and "Made in America") have no music at all.

The following is a list of songs used at the end of each episode:

Season 1

Season 2

Season 3

Season 4

Season 5

Season 6

Alternate music in Europe
For the version of the series aired in Europe, the producers partially replaced the music for licensing reasons. European DVD editions (in case of Season One: only the 16:9 re-issue) contain these altered versions as foreign language dubs as well as the original unaltered English soundtrack in Dolby Digital 5.1.

Soundtrack compilations

To date, there have been two official soundtrack compilations released in association with The Sopranos. The first, titled The Sopranos: Music from the HBO Original Series, was released in 1999, and contains selections from the show's first two seasons. The second, titled The Sopranos: Peppers & Eggs: Music from the HBO Original Series, was released in 2001, and contains two Compact Discs of songs from the show's first three seasons.

Track listings

The Sopranos: Music from the HBO Original Series
"Woke Up This Morning" (Chosen One Mix) — Alabama 3
"It's Bad You Know" — R. L. Burnside
"It Was a Very Good Year" — Frank Sinatra
"Gotta Serve Somebody" — Bob Dylan
"Inside of Me" — Little Steven & The Disciples of Soul
"I Feel Free" — Cream
"Mystic Eyes" — Them
"State Trooper" — Bruce Springsteen
"I'm a Man" — Bo Diddley
"Complicated Shadows" — Elvis Costello & the Attractions
"The Beast in Me" — Nick Lowe
"Viking" — Los Lobos
"Blood Is Thicker than Water" — Wyclef Jean featuring G & B
"I've Tried Everything" — Eurythmics

The Sopranos - Peppers and Eggs: Music From The HBO Series

Disc one

"Every Breath You Take/Theme From Peter Gunn" (Mr. Ruggerio's Remix) - The Police; Henry Mancini and His Orchestra
"Battle Flag" (Album Version) - Pigeonhed
"I've Got A Feeling" (Album Version) - The Campbell Brothers with Katie Jackson
"The Captain" (Album Version) - Kasey Chambers
"Shuck Dub" (Album Version) - R.L. Burnside
"Affection" (Album Version) - The Lost Boys
"My Lover's Prayer" (Album Version) - Otis Redding
"Certamente" (Album Version) Madreblu
"Black Books" (Album Version) - Nils Lofgren
"Frank Sinatra" (Album Version) - Cake
"Baubles, Bangles and Beads" (Album Version) - Frank Sinatra
"Thru And Thru" (Album Version) - The Rolling Stones

Disc two
"High Fidelity" - Elvis Costello & The Attractions
"Living on a Thin Line" - The Kinks
"Girl" - Vue
"Vivaldi: Sposa son disprezzata" - Cecilia Bartoli
"I Who Have Nothing" - Ben E. King
"Return to Me" - Bob Dylan
"Make no Mistake" - Keith Richards
"Piove" - Lorenzo Jovanotti
"Space Invader" - The Pretenders
"Tiny Tears" - Tindersticks
"Gloria" - Van Morrison
"Core 'ngrato" - Dominic Chianese
"Dialogue From 'The Sopranos'" - The Sopranos Cast

External links
 The Sopranos soundtracks on Tunefind

References

The Sopranos
Sopranos